Sir William Chaytor, 1st Baronet (29 April 1771 – 28 January 1847) was a British politician and businessman.

Chaytor was the illegitimate son of William Chaytor, by Jane Lee (they were later married).

He had banking interests and was a major landowner in north east England. He owned Witton Park, the estate of Witton Castle, within which he developed the Witton Park Colliery. He became a board member of the Stockton and Darlington Railway which served the pit. The architect Ignatius Bonomi extended Witton Castle and built the Croft Spa Hotel and the now-demolished Clervaux Castle near Croft for Chaytor.

Chaytor was made a baronet in 1831. He served as a Whig Member of Parliament for Sunderland from 1832 to 35 and was a supporter of Earl Grey and of the Reform Act 1832. He was appointed High Sheriff of Durham in 1839.

Chaytor was married to Isabella (1781–1854). Their eldest son, also William Chaytor, was also a Member of Parliament.

Notes

References
Kidd, Charles, Williamson, David (editors). Debrett's Peerage and Baronetage (1990 edition). New York: St Martin's Press, 1990,

External links 
 

1771 births
1847 deaths
Baronets in the Baronetage of the United Kingdom
Members of the Parliament of the United Kingdom for English constituencies
UK MPs 1832–1835
Whig (British political party) MPs for English constituencies
High Sheriffs of Durham
People from County Durham (district)